The First Inauguration of Boris Yeltsin as the first President of Russia took place on Wednesday, 10 July 1991. The ceremony was held at the State Kremlin Palace and it lasted about thirty minutes. It was the first presidential inauguration ceremony in the history of Russia.

Background

As a result of nationwide referendum on the introduction of the post of the President of Russia, the first presidential election was held. Boris Yeltsin won the elections, gaining more than 58 percent of the vote. He took office a month after the elections.

Inaugural events

In 1991, President of Russia, as well as in the United States, elected together with the Vice President. However, in contrast to the American tradition, Vice President Alexander Rutskoy did not bring an oath, but was present at the ceremony as a guest.

Ceremony

Boris Yeltsin was invited to the podium to take the oath. Yeltsin took the oath of keeping the right hand on your heart, at the same time, the Constitution of Russian SFSR and the Soviet Union, as well as the Declaration of State Sovereignty of Russia lay in front of him. After taking the oath musicians begin to play the Russian anthem.

After completion of the national anthem, Boris Yeltsin went to the desk behind which sat Ruslan Khasbulatov. Sitting at the table Yeltsin and Khasbulatov listened to a speech of the Patriarch of Moscow and All Russia Alexy II. After the speech of the Patriarch, Yeltsin delivered his first speech as President of Russia, followed by a congratulatory speech from President of the USSR Mikhail Gorbachev.

The Oath
Unlike subsequent inaugural ceremonies on this Boris Yeltsin read out another oath.

References

Politics of Russia
Yeltsin 1
Boris Yeltsin
1991 in Russia
1991 in Moscow